Sredny Dvor is a rural locality (a village) in Nikolskoye Rural Settlement, Kaduysky District, Vologda Oblast, Russia. The population was 6 as of 2002.

Geography 
Sredny Dvor is located 42 km northeast of Kaduy (the district's administrative centre) by road. Koposovo is the nearest rural locality.

References 

Rural localities in Kaduysky District